Nguyễn Thị Thanh Nhã (born 25 September 2001) is a Vietnamese footballer who plays as a forward for Vietnam Women's Championship club Hà Nội I and the Vietnam women's national team.

International career
She represented Vietnam at the 2022 AFC Women's Asian Cup in India and won a gold medal at the 2021 SEA Games on home soil.

International goals

Personal life
Her name, Thanh Nhã, means "elegant" or "graceful".

Achievements
 Women's Football 31st SEA Games: Gold medal

References

External links

2001 births
Living people
Women's association football forwards
Vietnamese women's footballers
People from Hanoi
Vietnam women's international footballers
21st-century Vietnamese women
Competitors at the 2021 Southeast Asian Games
Southeast Asian Games competitors for Vietnam